Dominik Meffert and Frederik Nielsen were the defending champions, but decided not to participate.
Sanchai Ratiwatana and Sonchat Ratiwatana won the title, beating Axel Michon and Guillaume Rufin 6–0, 6–4 in the final.

Seeds

Draw

Draw

References
 Main Draw

Internationaux de Nouvelle-Caledonie - Doubles
2012 Doubles